Stigmatophora torrens is a moth in the subfamily Arctiinae. It was described by Arthur Gardiner Butler in 1879. It is found in Japan.

References

Arctiidae genus list at Butterflies and Moths of the World of the Natural History Museum

Moths described in 1879
Lithosiini
Moths of Japan